Shopfront Arts Co-op is a theatre facility, with three rehearsal studios, sound studio and digital film editing suite, located in Carlton, New South Wales, Australia. Also known as Shopfront Theatre For Young People, its stated aim is to provide space, resources, training, and development opportunities for young artists, aged between 8 and 26.

Company history 

Shopfront was formed in 1976 in Penshurst, by Errol Bray and Garry Fry, two theatre directors, devoted to the of providing opportunities upcoming writers, actors and directors, because, in the words of Bray: "Too often the expression and creative ability of young people is patronised or ignored."

Australian actors have started careers there or taught there, such as actors Trevor Ashley and Paul Capsis, director Andrew Upton and comedian Julia Zemiro.

Productions have been as diverse as The Greening of the Common in 1983 (about the Greenham Common Women's Peace Camp), Detective Story by Sidney Kingsley and Jean-Paul Sartre's In Camera both in 1991 to Romeo and Juliet in 2015.  Its company was invited to perform its play Piece by Piece for International Youth Year at the United Nations in June 1985. 

Shopfront started running workshops in Hurstville under the name St George Theatre for Young People. It began in a dancehall on Carlton Parade, an adjacent house and two shops – a women’s fashion store and a butcher shop – hence the name Shopfront Theatre. In 1979 the co-operative raised money to buy the building – through 50-hour Actathons, costume parades, raffles, income from show, donations they raised $43,000, and with the additional help of Rockdale and Hurstville Council, the NSW Government, with a bank loan the building was purchased by the young people's coop. Thirty years later Shopfront was still at the venue but had shortened its name to Shopfront. The organisation shut down 1990 for seven years, by 1997 it had "risen from the ashes." Thanks to funding from Australia Council for the Arts and the Member for Banks, the site was redeveloped as a three-storey creative arts and community centre for the region.

Australian National Young Playwrights Weekend and "Interplay"
From 1977 Shopfront initiated and hosted the Australian National Young Playwrights Weekend. Held annually, this weekend congress brought together youth from all over the country who were actively writing for live theatre. Local professional acting and writing talent such Max Gillies as Anna Volska and Pamela Van Amstel volunteered as mentors, and attendees' plays would be workshopped privately or performed in full in the Shopfront theatre space. The event ran into the 1990s.

In 1984 the concept evolved to become the ambitious "World Interplay", billed as The 1st International Festival of Young Playwrights, which drew more than 40 participants from the UK, Europe, Central America and the USA. The first patrons of the festival included Dorothy Hewett, Edward Bond and Stephen Sondheim.

Notable former members 
Paul Capsis
Andrew Upton
Trevor Ashley
Hillary Bell
Julia Zemiro

Productions

References

External links 
 http://www.shopfront.org.au Official Website
 Review on POP UP! Sydney Morning Herald 2006

Theatres in Sydney
Theatre companies in Australia